Charles Lafayette Witherow (April 1852 – July 3, 1948) was a professional baseball pitcher. He appeared in one game for the 1875 Washington Nationals of the National Association. He was the starting pitcher for the Nationals on July 1, but only lasted one inning as he gave up four hits and five runs, two runs which were earned. At the time of his death, Charles Witherow was the last surviving participant of the National Association.

External links

Major League Baseball pitchers
Washington Nationals (NA) players
St. Paul Red Caps players
Baseball players from Washington, D.C.
19th-century baseball players
1852 births
1948 deaths